The Sovanco Fracture Zone is a right lateral-moving transform fault and associated fracture zone located offshore of Vancouver Island in Canada.  It runs between the northern end of the Juan de Fuca Ridge and the southern end of the Explorer Ridge, forming part of the boundary between the Pacific Plate and the Explorer Plate. To its west lies the Explorer Seamount.

References
Cowan, Darrel S.; Botros, Mona; Johnson, H. Paul, 1986, Bookshelf tectonics: rotated crustal blocks within the Sovanco fracture zone, Geophysical Research Letters, Volume 13, Issue 10, p. 995-998, abstract

Fracture zones
Geology of British Columbia
South Coast of British Columbia
Oceanography of Canada